The Park Ranges, also known as the Main Ranges, are a group of mountain ranges in the Canadian Rockies of southeastern British Columbia and southwestern Alberta, Canada. It is one of the three main subranges and the most central of the Continental Ranges, extending from southeast of Mount McGregor to the Fernie Basin.

Subranges
Blackwater Range
Blue Range
Bow Range
Chaba Icefield
Clemenceau-Chaba
Columbia Icefield
Drummond Group
Freshfields
Harrison Group
Hooker Icefield
Kitchen Range
Le Grand Brazeau
McKale-Chalco Divide
Mitchell Range
Morkill Ranges
Ottertail Range
Rainbow Range
Royal Group
Selwyn Range
Spray Mountains
Sundance Range
The Ramparts
Trident Range
Van Horne Range
Vermilion Range
Wapta Icefield
Waputik Icefield
Waputik Mountains
President Range
Winston Churchill Range

References

Park Ranges in the Canadian Mountain Encyclopedia

Ranges of the Canadian Rockies